This is a list of hip hop musicians from El Salvador.

Rappers
Pescozada
Reyes del Bajo Mundo
Crooked Stilo
Mecate
T-Bone

Producers
Omnionn
Crooked Stilo

Salvadoran rappers
Salvadoran music